Wepo Village is a populated place situated in Navajo County, Arizona, United States. Located 5 miles north of Walpi, it is within the boundaries of the Hopi Reservation  The name comes from the Hopi word for "onion".

References

Populated places in Navajo County, Arizona